Zamanabad (also Romanized as Zamānābād) is a village in Shaban Rural District, in the Central District of Nahavand County, Hamadan Province, Iran. At the 2006 census, its population was 264, in 76 families.

References 

Populated places in Nahavand County